Christine Roque (born June 7, 1965, in Toulouse, France) is a French singer and a one-hit wonder for her 1987 hit single "Premiers frissons d'amour".

Biography
After being a classical dance teacher, she decided to go to Paris to begin a music career. Her first single, "Premiers frissons d'amour", was written by Corinne Sinclair, and achieved Silver status in France and hit No. 10 on the SNEP chart. Roque gained a price for her performance during the festival in Bordeaux. Over the next three years, she released "Jérémy", "Rêves impudiques" and "Sale menteur", which were unsuccessful. She has two sisters.

Discography

Singles
 1987 : "Premiers frissons d'amour – No. 10 in France, Silver disc
 1988 : "Jérémy"
 1988 : "Rêves impudiques"
 1989 : "Sale menteur"

References

External links
 "Christine Roque de A à Z", in Ok! Âge tendre magazine n° 676 (December 26, 1988)

1965 births
Living people
Musicians from Toulouse
Roque, Christine